Adam Rosendale is an American politician and businessman who served as a member of the Montana House of Representatives for the 51st district in 2017.

Early life and education
Rosendale was born in Centerville, Montana and lived in Billings, Montana. His father, Matt Rosendale, is a member of the United States House of Representatives.

Career 
Rosendale and his brother, Brian Rosendale, owned Atlas Contracting and had developed family property in Black Eagle, Montana into the Eagles Crossing development consisting of condominiums, homes, and businesses. Rosendale served briefly in the Montana House of Representatives, from January 2, 2017, to November 18, 2017. He resigned when he moved to Great Falls, Montana.

References

Year of birth unknown
Living people
Politicians from Billings, Montana
Politicians from Great Falls, Montana
Businesspeople from Montana
Republican Party members of the Montana House of Representatives
Year of birth missing (living people)